Hartford Township is a township in Iowa County, Iowa, USA.

History
Hartford Township was established in 1854.

References

Townships in Iowa County, Iowa
Townships in Iowa
1854 establishments in Iowa